Cao Chunying (born 8 May 1974 in Zhuozhou) is a retired Chinese track and field athlete who specialized in the 400 metres event.

Achievements

References

All-Athletics profile for Cao Chunying

1974 births
Living people
Chinese female sprinters
Asian Games medalists in athletics (track and field)
Runners from Hebei
Asian Games gold medalists for China
Medalists at the 1994 Asian Games
Athletes (track and field) at the 1994 Asian Games
Sportspeople from Baoding
20th-century Chinese women